L'Obstinée was a Masonic Lodge founded in the German prisoner-of-war camp Oflag XD during World War II. Together with the Lodges Liberté chérie and "Les frères captifs d'Allach", it was one of the very few lodges founded within a Nazi concentration or POW camp.

The Lodge 
The Masonic Lodge L'Obstinée was founded by members of the Grand Orient of Belgium. Jean Rey, who would become President of the European Commission (Rey Commission), was orator of the lodge. The Grand Orient of Belgium would recognize the Lodge on 14 July 1946.

References

Sources
 Van liberalisme en antiklerikalisme naar militante vrijzinnigheid - De oorlogstijd 
 Le Judenlager des Mazures 

Grand Orient of Belgium
Masonic Lodges
Belgian prisoners of war in World War II